SS Joseph Hewes (MC contract 217) was a Liberty ship built in the United States during World War II. She was named after Joseph Hewes, Secretary of the Naval Affairs in the 2nd Continental Congress and signer of the Declaration of Independence for North Carolina.

The ship was laid down by North Carolina Shipbuilding Company in their Cape Fear River yard on September 22, 1941, and launched on March 29, 1942. She was chartered to A. H. Bull Steamship Company upon completion in 1942 by the War Shipping Administration.  This was renewed in May 1947.  In August of that year it was chartered to the States Marine Corporation.  It was briefly operated in October 1948 by the South Atlantic Steamship Company before being laid up in the National Defense Reserve Fleet at Beaumont, Texas.  It was sold for scrap in 1967.

See also 
 USS Joseph Hewes (AP-50)

References 

Liberty ships
Ships built in Wilmington, North Carolina
1942 ships